Blenheim is a rural locality in the Lockyer Valley Region, Queensland, Australia.

History 
Originally the district was known as Sandy Creek, but later it was named Blenheim after Blenheim Park in Oxfordshire, England, which was in turn named after the Battle of Blenheim.

Blenheim State School opened on 7 April 1879, with an initial enrolment of 73 pupils.

In 1895, a German Baptist church was established at Blenheim under the leadership of C. Muetzelburg. As time passed, the desire for German language church services diminished and, due to falling numbers attending, the church was closed and physically relocated to Laidley.

Blenheim Lutheran Church opened on Sunday 31 March 1912. In 1938, it was relocated to Laidley to be used as a church hall for the Laidley Lutheran Church.

In the 2011 census, Blenheim had a population of 259 people.

Heritage listings 
Blenheim has a number of heritage-listed sites including:

 Blenheim State School, 81 Blenheim Road

Education 
Blenheim State School is a government primary (Prep-6) school for boys and girls at 81 Blenheim Road. In 2018, the school had an enrolment of 81 students with 5 teachers (4 full-time equivalent) and 5 non-teaching staff (4 full-time equivalent).

There are no secondary schools in Blenheim. The nearest government secondary schools are Laidley State High School in Laidley to the north-east and Lockyer District State High School in Gatton to the north-west.

References

External links 

 

Lockyer Valley Region
Localities in Queensland